Robert Lasner is the co-founder of Ig Publishing, a publishing company based in Brooklyn, New York. His books include For Fucks Sake, a bildungsroman novel which gained somewhat of a cult following, and The Real Republican Dictionary, a satirical dictionary of the Republican lexicon . Lasner also co-edited Proud to be Liberal, a collection of essays from liberal voices in America. His short story, "Snow Forts," was featured in the anthology, Forgotten Borough: Writers Come to Terms With Queens, published by SUNY Press.

Bibliography
For Fucks Sake (2002)
Proud to Be Liberal (editor) (2005)
The Real Republican Dictionary (2006)
Forgotten Borough: Writers Come to Terms with Queens (2011)

External links
Ig Publishing homepage
For Fucks Sake
SUNY Press Page for Forgotten Borough

Year of birth missing (living people)
Living people
21st-century American novelists
American male novelists
American political writers
American publishers (people)
21st-century American male writers
21st-century American non-fiction writers
American male non-fiction writers